This is a list of nationwide public opinion polls that have been conducted relating to the Democratic primaries for the 2016 United States presidential election. The persons named in the polls are declared candidates, are former candidates, or have received media speculation about their possible candidacy.

Aggregate polling
In the following tables, blue indicates the highest percentage and percentages within the margin of error of the highest in each poll.

Individual polls

Polls conducted in 2016

Polls conducted in 2015

Polls conducted in 2014

Polls conducted in 2013

See also
General election polling
Nationwide opinion polling for the United States presidential election, 2016
Nationwide opinion polling for the United States presidential election by demographics, 2016
Statewide opinion polling for the United States presidential election, 2016

Democratic primary polling
Statewide opinion polling for the Democratic Party presidential primaries, 2016

Republican primary polling
Nationwide opinion polling for the Republican Party 2016 presidential primaries
Statewide opinion polling for the Republican Party presidential primaries, 2016

References

Opinion polling for the 2016 United States presidential election
2016 United States Democratic presidential primaries